TV3 Sport is a TV sports channel available in the Baltic States. The channel was launched 7 January 2009 as Viasat Sport Baltic. Along with Viasat Golf it replaced Viasat Sport 2 and Viasat Sport 3 for viewers on the Viasat platform in Estonia, Latvia and Lithuania.

In August 2018, the Viasat Sport Baltic channel changed its name to TVPlay Sports. A second channel, TVPlay Sports+, was launched in October. In December 2019, the channels TVPlay Sports changed their name to TV3 Sport and TVPlay Sports+ to TV3 Sport 2. In January 2021, TV3 Group started broadcasting a new channel, TV3 Sport Open, expanding the group's range of sports programs. In April, the TV3 Sport 4 channel ceased operations due to the reduction of live broadcasts.

Major sport rights of the channel include Copa del Rey, Eredivisie, Euroleague, Eurocup, La Liga, Liga ACB, Ligue 1, NBA, Serie A, UFC, World Rally Championship, Formula E, King of Kings, WWE, BOXXER, Basketball Champions League, Moto GP, Extreme E and the IAAF Diamond League. On 10 August 2018 the name of the channel was changed to TVPlay Sports and on 1 December 2019 the name was changed to TV3 Sport.

As with other channels of the All Media Baltics group in the Baltic states, it switched to HD broadcasting on 26 July 2018.

References

Television channels in Estonia
Television channels in Latvia
Television channels in Lithuania
Modern Times Group
2009 establishments in Estonia
2009 establishments in Latvia
2009 establishments in Lithuania
Television channels and stations established in 2009
Sport in the Baltic states